The year of 1870 included challenge matches in the table-top cue sports of pool disciplines and English billiards.

Pool
The following notable challenge matches took place in 1870.

English billiards
A number of matches took place on a challenge basis which are recognised as the equivalent of the world professional championship of billiards.

Reference section

cue
Cue sports by year
1870-related lists